Gulf Islands National Seashore offers recreation opportunities and preserves natural and historic resources along the Gulf of Mexico barrier islands of Florida and Mississippi. The protected regions include mainland areas and parts of seven islands. Some islands along the Alabama coast were originally considered for inclusion, but none are part of the National Seashore.

 of the seashore features offshore barrier islands with sparkling white quartz sand beaches (along miles of undeveloped land), historic fortifications, and nature trails. Mainland features near Pensacola, Florida, include the Naval Live Oaks Reservation, beaches, and military forts. All Florida areas are accessible by automobile.

The Mississippi District of the seashore features natural beaches, historic sites, wildlife sanctuaries, islands accessible only by boat, bayous, nature trails, picnic areas, and campgrounds. The Davis Bayou Area is the only portion of the National Seashore in Mississippi that is accessible by automobile.  Petit Bois, Horn, East Ship, West Ship, and Cat islands are accessible only by boat.  The  Gulf Islands Wilderness offers special protection within the seashore to parts of Petit Bois Island and Horn Island, Mississippi.

Considerable damage to public infrastructure occurred as a result of storms during the 2004 and 2005 Atlantic hurricane seasons.  In subsequent years, infrastructure was fully repaired.  All roadways, parking areas, campgrounds, and visitor centers have been repaired and are fully operational.  A few trails and associated boardwalks and dune crossovers were still under repair as of late 2010, especially near the Fort Pickens campground.

Hurricane Sally hit the area in September 2020 causing massive damage to the Gulf Islands Seashores. Perdido Key was hit with flooding waters that flattened out some of the dunes along Perdido Key. Johnson Beach National Seashore, part of the Gulf Island National Seashore at the east end of the island, was hit particularly hard. Many of the dunes were flattened and the end of the island was gorged forming 3 small isolated islands off the tip. Restoration projects bring in sand and vegetation to restore storm damage, though it can be a long process with subsequent storms and strong winds.

Entrance fees are charged at the entrance to the Fort Pickens area at Pensacola Beach, as well as the Johnson Beach Area at Perdido Key in Florida.  The typical automobile entrance fee is US$25, good for seven days.  Annual passes can be purchased for US$45.

Islands

Principal islands in the seashore (from east to west):
 Santa Rosa Island - Florida
 Perdido Key - Florida
 Petit Bois Island - Mississippi
 West Petit Bois Island (formerly known as Sand Island) - Mississippi
 Horn Island - Mississippi
 East Ship Island - Mississippi
 West Ship Island - Mississippi
 Cat Island - Mississippi

History 
The national seashore was authorized on January 8, 1971, and is administered by the National Park Service. The wilderness area was designated on November 10, 1978. Santa Rosa Island had been previously protected as a national monument from 1939 to 1946.

The Deepwater Horizon oil spill, beginning on April 20, 2010, released masses of oil and tar which began washing ashore, in varying amounts, along the Gulf Islands National Seashore on June 1, 2010. On June 23, 2010, wave after wave of oil pools and globs began covering the beaches on Santa Rosa Island,
resulting in a fishing and swimming ban. The oil-spill disaster affected every large island in the group.

Day Use Areas
There are 6 distinct areas of the seashore in Florida for visitors:

 Johnson Beach area on Perdido Key

 Fort Barrancas area on the Naval Air Station in Pensacola 
 Fort Pickens area on East Pensacola Beach
 Gulf Breeze area on Gulf Breeze
 Santa Rosa Island area on West Pensacola Beach
 Okaloosa Island area on Fort Walton Beach

Visitor centers
Four visitor centers, staffed by National Park personnel, are located within Gulf Islands National Seashore.  Two are located in Florida, and one is located in Mississippi.

Florida Visitor Centers
 Fort Barrancas Visitor Center (located aboard Naval Air Station Pensacola, Florida)
 Fort Pickens Discovery Center, Pensacola Beach, Florida
Mississippi Visitor Centers
 William M. Colmer Visitor Center (Davis Bayou Area), Ocean Springs, Mississippi
Near Fort Massachusetts

Camping
Two developed campgrounds are located in the National Seashore.  Primitive camping is also permitted in designated areas.

In Florida, the Pickens Campground is a developed one and provides water and electrical hookups for recreational vehicles and tents. Roads are paved throughout the campground, as well as each campsite.  The environment is characterized by sand scrub oaks, small brackish ponds, and a remnant pine forest on a barrier island between Pensacola Bay and the Gulf of Mexico.  Central restrooms and showers are available.  A campground store reopened in late 2010 (after being closed following storm damage from Hurricanes Ivan and Dennis in 2004 and 2005, respectively).  There are no sewer hookups at the campsites; however, a dump station is available. The campground is located approximately 1.5 miles (2 km) from Fort Pickens itself.

In Mississippi, the Davis Bayou Campground is developed, providing water and electrical hookups for recreational vehicles and tents.  Roads are paved throughout the campground, as well as each campsite. The environment is characterized by an oak and pine forest adjacent to a brackish bayou connected to Mississippi Sound.  Central restrooms and showers are available.  There are no sewer hookups at the campsites; however, a dump station is available.  The campground is located at the end of roadway leading through the Davis Bayou Area.

Primitive camping is permitted on several of the barrier islands.  Boating or hiking in is required.  Such camping is allowed on Perdido Key, Florida (east of Johnson Beach), and on government-owned properties on Petit Bois, Horn, East Ship, and Cat islands in Mississippi.

Geology

The barrier islands started forming 4500-5400 years ago. The white quartz sands originated from the Appalachian Mountains. The surface geology consists mainly of Holocene marine, beach and dune sands. On Santa Rosa Island, these lie unconformably on Pleistocene formations deposited during the Sangamonian Marine Isotope Stage 5, when the sea level was 3-6 meters (10-20 feet) above the present level. This includes the Gulfport Formation, a barrier complex with shallow nearshore, beach and dune sands, the Prairie Formation, deposited in nearshore marine and estuarine-lagoonal brackish environments, and the Biloxi Formation, consisting of floodplain alluvial deposits. Below these formations are the Pliocene Pensacola Clay, the Oligocene Tampa Member of the Arcadia Formation, and the Oligocene Chickasawhay Limestone. On Horn Island, the Holocene deposits overlay Miocene formations that includes the Pascagoula Formation, consisting of fluvial, estuarine, and nearshore marine (undifferentiated) deposits, the Hattiesburg Formation, consisting of fluvial, estuarine, and nearshore marine (undifferentiated) deposits, and the Catahoula Formation.

Climate

See also

 List of U.S. Wilderness Areas
 Hispanic Heritage Sites (U.S. National Park Service)

References

External links

 
 Official NPS website: Gulf Islands National Seashore
Gulf Island National Seashore in Florida
 Gulf Islands Wilderness
 Gulf Islands NS at Hiker Central
 Benthic Substrate Classification Map: Gulf Islands National Seashore United States Geological Survey 
 Geomorphology and Depositional Subenvironments of Gulf Islands National Seashore, Mississippi United States Geological Survey 
 Fort Pickens and the Outbreak of the Civil War, a National Park Service Teaching with Historic Places (TwHP) lesson plan

 
Beaches of Florida
National Seashores of the United States
National Park Service areas in Mississippi
National Park Service areas in Florida
Gulf of Mexico islands of the United States
Beaches of Mississippi
Protected areas of Escambia County, Florida
Protected areas of Harrison County, Mississippi
Protected areas of Jackson County, Mississippi
Protected areas of Okaloosa County, Florida
Protected areas of Santa Rosa County, Florida
Protected areas established in 1971
Islands of Escambia County, Florida
Landforms of Harrison County, Mississippi
Landforms of Jackson County, Mississippi
Islands of Okaloosa County, Florida
Islands of Santa Rosa County, Florida
Beaches of Escambia County, Florida
Beaches of Okaloosa County, Florida
Beaches of Santa Rosa County, Florida
Islands of Mississippi
Islands of Florida
1971 establishments in Mississippi
1971 establishments in Florida
Conservation in Navarre, Florida
Navarre, Florida
Tourist attractions in Santa Rosa County, Florida
Tourist attractions in Escambia County, Florida
Tourist attractions in Jackson County, Mississippi